Arthur Daer (22 November 1905 – 16 July 1980) was an English cricketer. He played for Essex between 1925 and 1935.

References

External links

1905 births
1980 deaths
English cricketers
Essex cricketers
Cricketers from Greater London
English cricketers of 1919 to 1945